Ondu Premada Kathe is a 1977 Indian Kannada-language romantic film is directed by S. M. Joe Simon. This film is the first south Indian black and white cinemascope. It stars Rajinikanth and Sharada in the lead roles.

Cast
 Rajinikanth as a local school chairman
 Sharada
 Manu
 Prema Karanth
 Ashok

References

Bibliography 
 

1970s Kannada-language films
1977 films
Indian black-and-white films
Films scored by T. G. Lingappa